Raúl Zamudio is a New York-based independent curator, art critic, art historian and educator.

Background
Zamudio was born in Tijuana, Mexico. He was raised in San Diego, California and moved to New York City where he currently lives and works. He received  undergraduate and graduate degrees in art history from the City University of New York, and also studied at the following institutions: Vassar College, Université Laval, Columbia University, and the Institute of Fine Arts, New York University. He is an alumnus of the Whitney Museum Independent Study Program in Critical Studies.

Curatorial work
He was Curator-at-Large, Pristine Galerie, Monterrey, Mexico; International Art Director, Other Gallery, Beijing, Shanghai; Director of Exhibitions, White Box, New York, NY; and  Curator-at-Large, the:artist:network, New York, NY. He has curated or co-curated over 100 exhibitions in the Americas, Asia and Europe including solo shows of Dennis Oppenheim, Javier Téllez, Miguel Angel Rios, Bik Van der Pol, Gordon Cheung, Riiko Sakkinen, Wojtek Ulrich, Shahram Entekhabi, Sun Yao, and Lui Lei, as well as group exhibitions including The Twilight of the Idols (Madrid),   The Metamorphosis (Shanghai), Body Double (Wrocław), The Picture of Dorian Gray (Mexico City), Under Your Skin (New York City), The Phantom Limb (Chicago), The Crystal Land Revisited (Newark), That Obscure Object of Desire (Monterrey, Mexico), The Bermuda Triangle (Miami), Under the Volcano (San Jose, Costa Rica) and Theater of Cruelty (New York City).

Raúl Zamudio's curatorial work is distinguished by an expansive approach underscored, for example, in the following exhibitions: Rayuela, which used  the structuralist configuration of the similarly titled novel by the writer Julio Cortázar as curatorial framework; The Passenger, based on the film by the director Michelangelo Antonioni; The Crystal Land Revisited, which was conceptually organized around an essay by the artist Robert Smithson; In the Future the Curator Will Point and Say, "Those Objects Over There is an Exhibition", based on an aphorism by Marcel Duchamp; The Pavilion of Realism , based on Gustave Courbet's rejection from the 1855 Exposition Universelle, which Zamudio presented in Shanghai during the 2010 World's Fair; another exhibition that incorporated a medical condition as thematic; and Art After Dark And After, a talk show in which he served as host that was both an interview program with artists and an art exhibition masked as dialogue and discussion. Apart from organizing exhibitions in galleries, art fairs, art festivals, alternative art spaces, academic and museum institutions, Zamudio was co-curator, "Here Is Where We Jump!," La Bienal 2013, El Museo del Barrio, New York, NY; co-curator, "City Without Walls," 2010 Liverpool Biennial; co-curator, Constellations: 2009 Beijing 798 Biennial; artistic director/curator, Garden of Delights: 2008 Yeosu International Art Festival; co-curator, Turn and Widen: 2008 Media_City Seoul International Media Art Biennial; and  co-curator of an official collateral  exhibition titled Poles, Apart, Poles Together presented at the 2005 Venice Biennial. His exhibitions have been reviewed in numerous periodicals including Art in America, Art Nexus Art Notes, Diario ABC, L Magazine, New York Art World, New York Times, Randian, and the Village Voice.

Criticism and writing
As an art critic, Raúl Zamudio has written over 200 published texts of which many have been translated into Chinese, Finnish, German, Italian, Japanese, Korean, Polish, Portuguese, and Spanish. He is author, co-author, or contributor to more than 70 art-related books and exhibition catalogs, and some of the artists he has written essays on include Francis Alys, Waltercio Caldas, Lygia Clark, Gordon Cheung, Lucio Fontana, Julio Galán, Damien Hirst, Rebecca Horn, Teresa Margolles, Cildo Meireles, Ana Mendieta, Gabriel Orozco, Helio Oiticica, Santiago Sierra, Jesús Rafael Soto, Javier Téllez, and Teresa Serrano. He is corresponding editor for Art Nexus, and his texts have appeared in numerous periodicals including Contemporary, TRANS> Arts Culture Media, Estilo, Art in Culture, Art Map, Zingmagazine, Art Notes, Laboratory, Framework: The Finnish Journal of Contemporary Art, Journal of the West, Tema Celeste, La Tempestad, Public Art, and Flash Art. Raúl Zamudio's writing has been cited by Reed Johnson of the Los Angeles Times in Johnson's article on war and beauty.

Teaching and lecturing
He currently teaches at John Jay College, and Parsons School of Design.

He has been a visiting critic/curator at Ehwa Women's University, Seoul; Sogang University, Seoul; Cheonam University, Cheonam; Royal College of Art, London; Tampere Polytechnic, Tampere; FRAME, Helsinki; Centrum Cultura Zamek, Wrocław; Oaxaca Museum of Contemporary Art; Escuela de Artes Plasticas,  San Juan, Puerto Rico; Museum of Contemporary Canadian Art, Toronto; Szamzie Space, Seoul; Art Omi, Ghent, New York; Newark Museum; and Location One, New York City. He has lectured, presented papers, delivered talks and participated on panels at universities, museums, galleries and art fairs including Harvard Divinity School, U.C. Berkeley, Stanford University, University of Southern California, University of Washington, CAM/New York University, Universidad de las Americas, Puebla, Mexico, Academy of Art, Wroclaw, Poland, Royal College of Art, Museum of Fine Arts, Boston, Cleveland Museum of Art, Whitney Museum of American Art, Guggenheim Museum, Drawing Center, PS 1 Museum/Clock Tower Gallery, National Museum of American History, Mexican Cultural Institute, Washington, D.C., the Americas Society, NY, The Cervantes Institute, NY, Seoul Museum of History, Other Gallery, Shanghai, Yan Yan Club, Beijing, Yeosu City Hall, MACO/Mexico City, Espacio Trapezio, Madrid, Spain, Carriage House, New York, NY, White Box, New York, NY, and Elizabeth Foundation for the Arts, New York, NY.

Select bibliography
2014
Zamudio, Raúl and Anne Strauss. Claudia Baez: Paintings After Proust. Brooklyn and Hong Kong: Art 3 Gallery, and DK Art Books. 
Zamudio, Raúl et al. Contempo: 2014 International Contemporary Art Festival. Varna: Contempo International Art Festival.
Zamudio, Raúl et al. Daniel Silvo: Casa, Bunker, Ruina. Madrid: Arte y Desarollo.
Zamudio, Raúl. Koh Sang Woo: Join Me There. Amsterdam: Wanrooij Gallery.
Zamudio, Raúl et al. Last Exit Project. Moving Trienniale: Made in Busan. Busan: Moving Triennale. 
Zamudio, Raúl. Lucero Gonzalez Jameson: Angelus Novus. Hong Kong: DK Art Books.   
Zamudio, Raúl. “The 2014 Whitney Biennial,” Art Nexus no. 93 vol. 13 (June-August): pp.60-64.
2013
Zamudio, Raúl. A Bomb, With Ribbon Around It. New York: SAWCC.
Zamudio, Raúl et al. Geometric Abstraction in Latin America, An Anthology of Texts. Edited by Ivonne Pini. Miami and Bogota: Art and Art; Art Nexus.
Zamudio, Raúl, Riiko Sakkinen, and Katja Tukiainen. Katja Tukiainen: Works, Part Two. Helsinki: Parves.
Zamudio, Raúl et al. Stefano Cagol: The Ice Monolith Platform. Venezia: Gerzani Foundation.
Zamudio, Raúl. “The Colossus of East Harlem,” Here Is Where We Jump!: La Bienal 2013. New York: El Museo del Barrio.
2012
Zamudio, Raúl et al., Mookie Tenembaum: Paranoia. Buenos Aires: Panta Rhei.
Zamudio, Raúl et al., Generaciones 2012. Madrid: Caja Madrid.
Zamudio, Raúl. “The 2012 Whitney Biennial,” Art Nexus no. 85 vol. 11 (June August): 40-44. 
2011
Zamudio, Raúl, and Adolfo Doring. Adolfo Doring: Nomenclature. Hong Kong: DK Art Books.
Zamudio, Raúl. “Cinema de la Crueldad.” La Tempestad (July–August): 126-129.
Zamudio, Raúl. Fernando Martin Godoy: Capitulo. Madrid: Caja Madrid.
Zamudio, Raúl, and Joe Pollitt. Lui Lei: Floating Ice Biography. Beijing: Other Gallery.
Zamudio, Raúl, Sophia Schultz, and Ilka Tödt. Shahram Entekhabi: Nothing Gold Can Stay. Beijing: Other Gallery.
Zamudio, Raúl, and Ricardo Cisneros. Ricardo Cisneros: Between Two Worlds. New York: Two Leaves Editions. http://twoleaveseditions.com/BETWEEN-TWO-WORLDS-RICARDO-CISNEROS-2011
Zamudio, Raúl et al., Stefano Cagol: Public Opinion. Eds. Iara Boubnova, Gregor Jansen, Michele Robecchi and Andrea Viliani. Milan and New York: Charta.
Zamudio, Raúl. The Third Eye/I. Shanghai: Other Gallery.
Zamudio, Raúl, Martha Gehman, and Howard Mean.Winslow McCagg: Recent Paintings. Winchester, VA: Two Streams Press.
Zamudio, Raúl, and Wojtek Ulrich. Wojtek Ulrich. Wroclaw: GREG.
Zamudio, Raúl, and Wojtek Ulrich. Wojtek Ulrich. Beijing: Other Gallery.
2010
Zamudio, Raúl, and Laura Rutkute. City Without Walls. 2010 Liverpool Biennial. Vilnius: Galerija Vartai.
Zamudio, Raúl. Damian Ontiveros: Towards a Relational Turn in Art. Nuevo León: Autonomous University of Nuevo León. .
Zamudio, Raúl. “Gabriel Orozco.” Art Nexus no. 76, vol. 9 (March–May): 56-58.
Zamudio, Raúl. Gordon Cheung: The Sleeper Awakes. Shanghai: Other Gallery.
Zamudio, Raúl. Gorka Mohamed: Tautologies. Seoul: Bright Treasure Art Projects.
Zamudio, Raúl, Carol Becker, Edwin Ramoran, and Sarah Reisman. Imageless: Jaye Rhee. Seoul: Specter Press.
Zamudio, Raúl. The Metamorphosis. Shanghai: Other Gallery.
Zamudio, Raúl, and Maarten Betheaux.The Pavilion of Realism. Shanghai: Other Gallery.
Zamudio, Raúl. “Public Art in South Korea.” Public Art (March–April): 86-90.
Zamudio, Raúl. “Rune Olsen.” MAG (August): np.
Zamudio, Raúl, and Yao Sun. Sun Yao: Topographies of the Self. Shanghai: Other Gallery.
Zamudio, Raúl. Suspensions of Disbelief. Shanghai: Other Gallery.
2009
Zamudio, Raúl. Abdul Vas: Anything Goes. Madrid: La Fresh Gallery.
Zamudio, Raúl, “All The World is a Screen: Soon Choi’s APT.” In Soon Choi: APT, Seoul: Brain Factory.
Zamudio, Raúl. “APT.” EYEBALL (September): np. 		
Zamudio, Raúl. "As Above So Below: From Plato’s Cave to Hitler’s Bunker.” Art Map no. 27 (October): 46–49.
Zamudio, Raúl. “Cildo Meireles.” Art Nexus no. 73, vol. 8 (June–August): 76-78.
Zamudio, Raúl. “David Maljkovic.” Flash Art vol. XLII, no. 265 (March–April): 83.   	
Zamudio, Raúl. Eternal Recurrence: The Art of Claudia Doring Baez. New York: Chelsea Art Museum.
Zamudio, Raúl. Eternal Recurrence: The Art of Lucero. New York: Chelsea Art Museum.
Zamudio, Raúl et al., Constellations: 2009 Beijing 798 Biennale. Beijing: Art Map.
Zamudio, Raúl et al., For You. Zurich: Daros Collection.
Zamudio, Raúl. “The Genie of History in Three Acts.” FRAMEWORK: The Finnish Journal of Contemporary Art no. 10 (June): 74-75.
Zamudio, Raúl. “Guthrie Lonergon: Text. Image. Sound. (Singular in Focus, not a Faggy Short Film)." EYEBALL (July): np.
Zamudio, Raúl et al., Janet Belloto: Wave. New York: The Lab.
Zamudio, Raúl. “Latin American Art, an Art that is neither Latin nor American.” Art Map no. 26 (September): 43-47.
Zamudio, Raúl, Henri-François Debailleux,  Phillipe Piguet, and Kwang Sui Oh. Lee Bae. Beijing: Today Art Museum.
Zamudio, Raúl. “Marina Zurkow: The Poster Children and Other Heroes of the Revolution.” EYEBALL (September): np.
Zamudio, Raúl. “Marco Maggi: Between Drawing and Withdrawing.” Art Nexus no. 75, vol. 8 (December 2009-February 2010): 60-64.
Zamudio, Raúl. My Mother's Garden. Seoul: Kim Hung Sun and Gallery 101 Space.
Zamudio, Raúl. “Toralth Knobloch.” Flash Art vol. XLII, no. 266 (May–June): 109.
Zamudio, Raúl. “Total Asshole Compression: Cory Arcangel’s Digital Detournement.” EYEBALL (January): np.        	
2008
Zamudio, Raúl. “5th Seoul International Media Biennial.” Flash Art vol. XLI, no. 259 (March–April): 145.
Zamudio, Raúl. “Adrian Piper.” Flash Art vol. XLI, no. 260 (May–June): 152.
Zamudio, Raúl. An Woong Chul:Sky Pictures. Seoul: Art and Dream.
Zamudio, Raúl. “Andro Wekua.” Flash Art vol. XLI, no. 260 (May–June): 151.
Zamudio, Raúl. “Edgar Orlaineta.” Flash Art vol. XLI, no. 259 (March–April): 81.
Zamudio, Raúl. Garden of Delights. Yeosu: Jinnam Cultural Center, and Chonnam University.
Zamudio, Raúl, and Donald Kuspit. Jorge Talca, Pinturas/Paintings. Santiago, Chile: Quebecor. .
Zamudio, Raúl. “Michael-Bell Smith.” Flash Art vol. XLI, no. 259 (March–April): 79.
Zamudio, Raúl. “Paul McCarthy.” Flash Art vol. XLI, no. 262 (October–November): 134.
Zamudio, Raúl. “Playing Dead: Joe Delappe’s Virtual Wars.” EYEBALL (May): np.
Zamudio, Raúl, Boggi Kim, Phoebe Hoban, and Richard Vine. Oh Chi Gyun: Defining Landscapes. Manchester, VT: Hudson Hills. .
Zamudio, Raúl. “Remembrance of a Bitmapped Past: Michael Bell-Smith's Media Art.” EYEBALL (April): np.
Zamudio, Raúl. “Sang Nam Lee.” Flash Art vol. XLI, no. 261 (Summer issue): 259.
Zamudio, Raúl. “Shadow Boxing: Notes on Rafael Lozano-Hemmer’s Shadow Box Series.” EYEBALL (October): np.
Zamudio, Raúl, Maarten Bertheux, Andreas Broeckman, and Ilho Park. Turn and Widen: 5th Seoul International Media Art Biennale. Seoul: Seoul Museum of Art. .
Zamudio, Raúl. “The 2008 Whitney Biennial.” Art Nexus no. 69, vol. 7 (June–August): 70-74.
2007
Zamudio, Raúl. “Aaron Hank.” Art Nexus no. 63, vol. 6 (January–March): 166.
Zamudio, Raúl. “Art Basel/Miami Beach.” Art Nexus no. 64, vol. 6 (April–June): 98-101.
Zamudio, Raúl. “Benjamin Torres.” Art Nexus no. 64, vol. 6 (April–June): 14-15.
Zamudio, Raúl. “Christopher Jankowski.” Flash Art vol. XL, no. 254 (June–July): 133.
Zamudio, Raúl. “Dan Topor.” Flash Art vol.  XL, no. 256 (October–November): 124.
Zamudio, Raúl. “Jonas Mekas.” [Art Notes] (January): 89.
Zamudio, Raúl. “Pedro Reyes.” Art Nexus no. 66, vol. 6 (October—November):  154.
Zamudio, Raúl. “Stefan Brüggerman.” Flash Art vol. XL, no. 252 (January–February): 115-116.
Zamudio, Raúl, and Marc Hungerbuhler. SURGE. Beijing: Artist Network, and OCT Contemporary Art Terminal.
Zamudio, Raúl. “Terence Koh.” Flash Art vol. XL, no. 253 (March–April): 123.	
Zamudio, Raúl. The Sweet Hereafter. Chicago and New York: Gosia Koscielak Gallery.
Zamudio, Raúl et al., Turn and Widen: Media Art Now and Future. Seoul: Seoul Museum of Art.
Zamudio, Raúl. Wojtek Ulrich: SCUM. New York: White Box.
2006
Zamudio, Raúl. “(212)-911.” In (212)-911, New York: White Box.
Zamudio, Raúl. “Art Basel/Miami Beach.” Art Nexus no. 60, vol. 5 (March–May): 110-113.
Zamudio, Raúl. “Cesar Cervantes: Collecting Art and the Art of Collecting.” Contemporary (special issue on contemporary art collections) no. 80 : 40-44.
Zamudio, Raúl. “Darkness Ascends.” Flash Art vol. XXXIX, no. 250 (September–October): 57.
Zamudio, Raúl, and Elżbieta Kościelak. Dubler/Body Double. Wroclaw: Polish Ministry of Culture, and Centrum Kultury Zamek Wroclaw-Lesnica. .
Zamudio, Raúl. “Oreet Ashery: Venus/Penis Envy?” Akrylic (February): np.
Zamudio, Raúl et al., Presente Perfecto/Present Perfect. Austin: Volitant Gallery.
Zamudio, Raúl. “Seth Price.” Flash Art vol. XXXIX, no. 251 (November–December): 116.
Zamudio, Raúl. “Sex and Death: The Art of Svai & Paul Stanikas.” NYARTS vol. 11, no.1/2 (January/February): 18.
Zamudio, Raúl. “Stephen Shore.” Flash Art vol. XXXIX, no.247 (March–April): 109-110.
Zamudio, Raúl. “Tamy Ben-Tor.” Flash Art vol. XXXIX, no.247(March–April): 111
Zamudio, Raúl. “The 2006 Whitney Biennial.” Art Nexus no. 62, vol. 5 (October–December): 72-75.
Zamudio, Raúl. “Tomas Saraceno.” Flash Art vol. XXXIX, no. 250 (September–October): 115.
2005
Zamudio, Raúl. “Ana Patricia Palacios.” Art Nexus no. 57, vol. 3 (July–August):148-149.
Zamudio, Raúl. “Cristian Silva.” Art Nexus no. 59, vol. 4 (December 2004-February 2005): 173-174.
Zamudio, Raúl. “Eel Kwon Kim: A Day in the Life of a Painting.” Arts in Culture no. 9: 116-117.
Zamudio, Raúl et al., The Encyclopedia of Twentieth-Century Photography. 3 vols., ed. Lynne Warren. London and New York: Routledge. .
Zamudio, Raúl. “Gabriel Orozco.” Art Nexus no. 59, vol. 4 (December 2004-February 2005):170-171.
Zamudio, Raúl. “Kazumi’s Transmigration and other Adventures.” In Transmigration, Tokyo: T & S Gallery.
Zamudio, Raúl. “The New MOMA.” Art Nexus no. 58 vol. 4, (September/November): 76.
Zamudio, Raúl. “The Pleasure Dome.” In The Pleasure Dome, New York: Bureau of Curatorial Affairs.
Zamudio, Raúl. “Retratos: 2000 years of Latin American Portraiture.” Art Nexus no. 58, vol. 4 (September–November): 162-164.
Zamudio, Raúl. “Sarah Lucas.” Flash Art vol. XXXVIII, no. 242 (May–June): 145.
Zamudio, Raúl, “Tania Bruguera.” Contemporary (special issue on Venice Biennial) vol. 74: 42-45.
Zamudio, Raúl et al., Transcultural New Jersey: Diverse Artists Shaping Culture and Communities. Vol. II, eds. Marianne Ficarra, Isabel Nazario, and Jeffrey Wechsler. Rutgers: The State University of New Jersey.
Zamudio, Raúl. “Video Fair or Video Fare?” Contemporary vol. 73: 49.
Zamudio, Raúl et al., Women in Love. New York: Tenri Cultural Institute.
2004
Zamudio, Raúl. “AAF Contemporary Art Fair,” Art Nexus no. 58, vol. 5 (December–January): 136-138
Zamudio, Raúl. “Alejandro Mazon.” Art Nexus no. 55, vol. 3 (December 2003-January 2004): 158-159.
Zamudio, Raúl. “America as Myth and Realty.” Framework: The Finnish Art Review, Double Issue (no. 1): 123-124.
Zamudio, Raúl, and Shin-Eui Park. Airan Kang, Digital Book Project. Seoul: A & A. .
Zamudio, Raúl. “Carlos Amorales.” Art Nexus no. 53, vol. 3  (July–September): 89-90.
Zamudio, Raúl, and Rocio Aranda Alvarado. Chakaia Booker: Jersey Ride. Jersey City: Jersey City Museum.
Zamudio, Raúl. “Damien Hirst.” In The Encyclopedia of Sculpture, 3 vols., ed. Antonia Boström, 753-755. London and New York: Routledge .
Zamudio, Raúl et al., Eel Kwon Kim. New York: John Jay Gallery, John Jay College, C.U.N.Y.
Zamudio, Raúl. “Eugenio Dittborn.” Art Nexus no. 54, vol.3 (October–November): 118-119.
Zamudio, Raúl. “Flash Mobsters.” Framework: The Finnish Journal of Contemporary Art (No. 3): 115-116.
Zamudio, Raúl. “Gregor Schneider.” Flash Art vol. XXXVII, no. 234 (January–February): 88.
Zamudio, Raúl, Marek Bartelik, Yongwoo Lee, and Thalia Vrachopoulos. Haesook Kim: Weltanschauung. Seoul and New York: Tenri Cultural Institute.
Zamudio, Raúl. “Jainana Tschape.” Art Nexus no. 53, vol. 3 (July–September): 90-91.
Zamudio, Raúl. “Jesus Rafael Soto.” In The Encyclopedia of Sculpture, 3 vols., ed. Antonia Boström, 1590-1592. London and New York: Routledge .
Zamudio, Raúl. “Lucio Fontana.” In The Encyclopedia of Sculpture, 3 vols., ed. Antonia Boström, 575-577. London and New York: Routledge .
Zamudio, Raúl. “Melik Ohanian.” Flash Art vol. XXXVII, no. 236 (May–June): 83.
Zamudio, Raúl, and Donald Kuspit. Norma Bessout: The Journey. Boston: Arden Gallery.
Zamudio, Raúl et al. POOL: Art Addict Underground Art Fair. New York: FRERE.
Zamudio, Raúl. “Rebecca Horn.” In The Encyclopedia of Sculpture, 3 vols., ed. Antonia Boström, 759-761. London and New York: Routledge .
Zamudio, Raúl. “Skin Deep and Bad to the Bone.” NYARTS vol. 9, no. 9/10 (September/October): 54.
Zamudio, Raúl. “Some Notes on Censorship and Art After 9/11.” Laboratory (March): np.
Zamudio, Raúl et al., Sylvia Wald. New York: Tenri Cultural Institute.
Zamudio, Raúl. “To Be Political It Doesn’t Have To Be Stereotypical.” Latinart, np.
2003
Zamudio, Raúl. “Adriana Varejao.” Flash Art vol. XXXVI, no. 230 (May–June): 90-91.
Zamudio, Raúl. “Architectonics of Painting.” NYARTS vol. 8, no. 6-8 (June/August): 51-52.
Zamudio, Raúl. “Energy and Entropy.” NYARTS vol. 8, no.9/11 (September/October): 55-56.
Zamudio, Raúl. "The Ear-Eye Problem." Berlinerkunst vol. 2, no. 3 (March): 46.
Zamudio, Raúl. "The Flaneur as Botanist." Berlinerkunst vol 2, no. 4 (April): 44.
Zamudio, Raúl et al., Going Public: Politics, Subjects, Place. Modena and Sassulo: MAST, 2003.
Zamudio, Raúl. Javier Telléz: Naming the Unnamble." Latinart (July): 1-3. 
Zamudio, Raúl. “Jorge Tacla: Expanding the Field of Painting.” Art Nexus no. 49 (July/September): 48-52.
Zamudio, Raúl. “Latin American Geometry.” Art Nexus no. 50, vol. 1 (October–December): 88-89.
Zamudio, Raúl. “Maria Elena Gonzalez.” Art Nexus no. 48, vol. 1 (April–June): 134-135.
Zamudio, Raúl. “Miami's Vice.” NYARTS vol. 8, no. 11/12 (November/December): 67-68.
Zamudio, Raúl. “The Missing: The Photography of Andrea Frank and Cleverson.” In Absences: Urban Alienation in Contemporary Photography, New York: Tenri Cultural Institute.
Zamudio, Raúl. “Rubens Gerchman.” Art Nexus no. 47, vol. 1 (January–March): 131-132.
Zamudio, Raúl. “Sylvia Wald.” NYARTS vol. 8, no. 6-8 (June–August): 14- 15.
2002
Zamudio, Raúl. “A New Touch of Evil.” Berlinerkunst vol 1, no. 12 (December): 6-7.
Zamudio, Raúl. “Apocalypse Forever: Dominic McGill’s Chaos Aesthetics.” NYARTS vol. 7, no. 4 (April): 8-9.
Zamudio, Raúl. "Art & Violence: Poetry after Auschwitz, Art after 9/11" NYARTS vol. 7, no. 2 (February): 38-39.
Zamudio, Raúl. “Architecture of Confinement.” In Javier Telléz: Blind Data, New York: Art in General.
Zamudio, Raúl. “Atelier Morales.” Flash Art vol. XXXV, no. 232 (October–November): 111.
Zamudio, Raúl. Blue on the Track. New York: Generous Miracles Gallery.
Zamudio, Raúl. “Breaking Alberti’s Window.” Berlinerkunst vol. 1, no. 11 (November): 21-22.
Zamudio, Raúl. “Daniel Senise.” In The St. James Guide to Hispanic Artists, ed. Thomas Riggs, 560-562. Detroit, MI: St. James Press. .
Zamudio, Raúl. "Enoc Perez." Art Nexus no. 45 (July–September): 117-118.
Zamudio, Raúl. “Francis Alÿs.” In The St. James Guide to Hispanic Artists, ed. Thomas Riggs, 19-20. Detroit, MI: St. James Press. .
Zamudio, Raúl. “Hélio Oiticica.” In The St. James Guide to Hispanic Artists, ed. Thomas Riggs, 423-424. Detroit, MI: St. James Press. .
Zamudio, Raúl. “Javier Telléz.” In Art Basel/Miami Art Fair, Basel and Miami: Art Basel/Miami Art Fair.
Zamudio, Raúl. “Javier Telléz: Institutionalized Aesthetics.” Flash Art vol. XXXV, no. 231 (July/September): 85-86. 
Zamudio, Raúl. “Julio Galan.” In The St. James Guide to Hispanic Artists, ed. Thomas Riggs, 219-221. Detroit, MI: St. James Press. .
Zamudio, Raúl et al., Kim Dae Won: Mountain Vistas and Guardian Spirits. New York: Tenri Cultural Institute.
Zamudio, Raúl. “Lucio Fontana.” In The St. James Guide to Hispanic Artists, ed. Thomas Riggs, 210-212. Detroit, MI: St. James Press. .
Zamudio, Raúl. “Lygia Clarke.” In The St. James Guide to Hispanic Artists, ed. Thomas Riggs, 134-135. Detroit, MI: St. James Press. .
Zamudio, Raúl. “Marco Arce.” Art Nexus no. 44 (April–June): 122-123.
Zamudio, Raúl. “Miguel Angel Rios.” In The St. James Guide to Hispanic Artists, ed. Thomas Riggs, 501-503. Detroit, MI: St. James Press. .
Zamudio, Raúl. “Monika Bravo.” Art Nexus no. 46 (October–December): 145.
Zamudio, Raúl, Jacob Fabricus, and Annie Fletcher. Op-Ed: Gerard Byrne. Dublin: Limerick City Gallery of Art, and The Douglas Hyde Gallery. .
Zamudio, Raúl “Stuart Croft: Mobius Trip.” NYARTS vol. 7, no. 1 (January): 6-7.
Zamudio, Raúl. "Sugar and Spice and Everything Nice.” NYARTS vol. 7, no. 6 (June): 88.
Zamudio, Raúl. “Waltercio Caldas.” In The St. James Guide to Hispanic Artists, ed. Thomas Riggs, 83-85. Detroit, MI: St. James Press..
Zamudio, Raúl et al., (The World May Be) FANTASTIC. Sydney: 2002 Sydney Biennial.
2001
Zamudio, Raúl. “Bik Van der Pol: Sculpture and its Double.” NYARTS vol 6, no. 2 (February): 12-13.
Zamudio, Raúl. “The Critic as Ethnographer.” NYARTS vol. 6, no.1 (January): 22-23.
Zamudio, Raúl. “Figures of Speech.” NYARTS vol. 6, no. 6 (June): 44-46.
Zamudio, Raúl. Guillermo Creus. New York: Cynthia Broan Gallery.
Zamudio, Raúl. “Javier Téllez.” Art Nexus no. 41 (August–October): 75-76.
Zamudio, Raúl. “Lygia Pape and Gerardo de Barros.” Art Nexus no. 42 (November–January): 87-88.
Zamudio, Raúl. “Rayuela.” In Hopscotch, Union, NJ: Kean University.
Zamudio, Raúl. “Miguel Angel Rios: Los ninos brotan de noche.” In Special Projects, Long Island City: PS1/MOMA.
Zamudio, Raúl. “Nature Denatured: Gabriel Orozco’s Recuperated Nature” NYARTS vol. 6, no. 7 (July/August): 46-48.
Zamudio, Raúl. “Rainer Ganahl.” Zingmagazine no. 15 (Summer): 105-106.
Zamudio, Raúl. “Randomly Shooting a Gun into a Crowd and Other Acts of Beauty.” In Bik van der Pol: Loompanics, New York: White Box.
Zamudio, Raúl. “Santiago Sierra’s Drifts and Detours.” NYARTS vol 6, no. 4 (April): 32-33.
Zamudio, Raúl. “Superimposition.” Tema Celeste (September–October): 84.
Zamudio, Raúl. Viva Cuba. New London, CT: Alva Gallery.
2000
Zamudio, Raúl. “Adriana Arenas.” Art Nexus no. 38 (November–January): 64-65.
Zamudio, Raúl. “Bodies Without Organs.” NYARTS vol.5, no.9 (September): 15.
Zamudio, Raúl. “Cildo Meireles.” Art Nexus no. 36 (May–July): 147-148.
Zamudio, Raúl. "Cildo Meireles: Knowing Can Be Destroying.” TRANS>Art Cultures Media no.7 (Spring): 144-152.
Zamudio, Raúl. "Criminal Ornamentation." In Roberto Juarez: Taste in Home Decorating, Walla Walla: Whitman College of Art and Design.
Zamudio, Raúl et al., FRERE: Independent Art Fair. New York: FRERE.
Zamudio, Raúl et al., The Grey Painting XII, New York: Nikolai Fine Art.
Zamudio, Raúl. “Painting as Remodeling.” NYARTS vol.5, no.7 (July/August): 16-17.
Zamudio, Raúl. “The Parallax Hotel.” In The Parallax Hotel, New York: Bureau of Curatorial Affairs.
Zamudio, Raúl. "Platos’ Cave, Alberti’s Window, Bentham’s Panopticon.” NYARTS vol. 5, no. 5. (May): 44.
Zamudio, Raúl. “Vik Muniz: Operations with/in Photography.” NYARTS vol.5, no.6 (June): 23-24.

See also
Contemporary art
Latin American art
New Media art
Postmodern art

References

External links
2010 Liverpool Biennial, City Without Walls
Constellations: 2009 Beijing 798 Biennial
Garden of Delights: 2008 Yeosu Art Festival
La Bienal, 2013: Here is Where We Jump!   
Poles Apart, Poles Together, 2005 Venice Biennial
Turn and Widen: 2008 Media_City Seoul International Media Art Biennial
weblog
Wikipedia entry in Spanish

Living people
Year of birth missing (living people)
American art critics
American art curators
American art historians
People from Tijuana
People from San Diego
People from New York City
City University of New York alumni
John Jay College of Criminal Justice faculty
Parsons School of Design faculty
Mexican emigrants to the United States
American people of Indigenous Mexican descent